Scott Jennings is the name of:

Scott Jennings (born 1977),  a United States political appointee in the administration of George W. Bush
Scott Jennings (game designer) (born 1966), American commentator on MMORPG games